

Acts of the Scottish Parliament

}}

References

2023